Rybník may refer to:

 Rybník, Levice District, a village in Slovakia
 Rybník, Revúca District, a village in Slovakia
 Rybník (Domažlice District), a village in Czech Republic
 Rybník (Ústí nad Orlicí District), a village in Czech Republic

See also 
 Rybnik (disambiguation)